The 1948 Texas gubernatorial election was held on November 2, 1948.

Incumbent Democratic Governor Beauford H. Jester defeated Republican nominee Alvin H. Lane with 84.72% of the vote.

Democratic primary
The Democratic primary election was held on July 24, 1948. By winning over 50% of the vote, Jester avoided a run-off which would have been held on August 28, 1948.

Candidates
Roger Q. Evans, State Representative and unsuccessful candidate for Democratic nomination for Governor in 1932
Beauford H. Jester, incumbent Governor
Charles B. Hutchison, unsuccessful candidate for Democratic nomination for Governor in 1946
Caso March, Baylor University law professor and unsuccessful candidate for Democratic nomination for Governor in 1946
Holmes A. May, merchant
W. J. Minton, newspaper editor and unsuccessful candidate for Democratic nomination for Governor in 1944 and 1946
Sumpter W. Stockton

Withdrew
Denver S. Whiteley (endorsed March)

Results

Republican nomination
The Republicans unanimously nominated Alvin H. Lane, attorney, at their convention on August 10, 1948.

General election

Candidates
Beauford H. Jester, incumbent Governor (Democratic)
Alvin H. Lane, attorney (Republican)
Gerald Overholt, pastor (Prohibition)
Herman Wright, attorney (Progressive)

Results

References

Bibliography
 
 

1948
Texas
Gubernatorial
November 1948 events in the United States